Bactria (Bactrian:), or Bactriana, was an ancient Iranian civilization in Central Asia centered on modern day Northern Afghanistan and including parts of southwestern Tajikistan and southeastern Uzbekistan.

Called "beautiful Bactria, crowned with flags" by the Avesta, the region is considered in Zoroastrianism to be one of the sixteen perfect Iranian lands that the supreme deity Ahura Mazda had created. One of the early centres of Zoroastrianism and capital of the legendary Kayanian kings of Iran, Bactria is mentioned in the Behistun Inscription of Darius the Great as one of the satrapies of the Achaemenid Empire; it was a special satrapy and was ruled by a crown prince or an intended heir. Bactria was the centre of Iranian resistance against the Macedonian invaders after the fall of the Achaemenid Empire in the 4th century BC, but eventually fell to Alexander the Great. After the death of Alexander, Bactria was annexed by his general, Seleucus I.

The Seleucids lost the region after the declaration of independence by the satrap of Bactria, Diodotus I; thus began the history of the Greco-Bactrian and the later Indo-Greek Kingdoms. By the 2nd century BC, Bactria was conquered by the Parthian Empire, and in the early 1st century, the Kushan Empire was formed by the Yuezhi in the Bactrian territories. Shapur I, the second Sasanian King of Kings of Iran, conquered western parts of the Kushan Empire in the 3rd century, and the Kushano-Sasanian Kingdom was formed. The Sasanians lost Bactria in the 4th century, but reconquered it in the 6th century. With the Muslim conquest of Iran in the 7th century, the Islamization of Bactria began.

Bactra was centre of an Iranian Renaissance in the 8th and 9th centuries, and New Persian as an independent literary language first emerged in this region. The Samanid Empire was formed in Eastern Iran by the descendants of Saman Khuda, a Persian from Bactria, beginning the spread of the Persian language in the region and the decline of the Bactrian language. Bactrian, an Eastern Iranian language, was the common language of Bactria and surroundings areas in ancient and early medieval times.

Etymology 

The modern English name of the region is Bactria. Historically, the region was first mentioned in Avestan as Bakhdi in Old Persian. This later developed into Bāxtriš in Middle Persian and Baxl in New Persian. Other cognates include .   بلخ (Romanized: Balx), Chinese 大夏 (pinyin: Dàxià), Latin Bactriana. The region was mentioned in ancient Sanskrit texts as बाह्लीक or Bāhlīka.

Geography 
Bactria was located in Central Asia in an area that comprises most of modern-day Afghanistan and parts of Uzbekistan and Tajikistan. To the south and east, it was bordered by the Hindu Kush mountain range. On its western side, the region was bordered by the great Carmanian desert and to the north it was bound by the Oxus river. The land was noted for its fertility and its ability to produce most ancient Greek agricultural products, with the notable exception of olives.

According to Pierre Leriche:

History

Bronze Age 

The Bactria–Margiana Archaeological Complex (BMAC, also known as the "Oxus civilization") is the modern archaeological designation for a Bronze Age archaeological culture of Central Asia, dated to c. 2200–1700 BC, located in present-day eastern Turkmenistan, northern Afghanistan, southern Uzbekistan and western Tajikistan, centred on the upper Amu Darya (known to the ancient Greeks as the Oxus River), an area covering ancient Bactria. Its sites were discovered and named by the Soviet archaeologist Viktor Sarianidi (1976). Bactria was the Greek name for Old Persian Bāxtriš (from native *Bāxçiš) (named for its capital Bactra, modern Balkh), in what is now northern Afghanistan, and Margiana was the Greek name for the Persian satrapy of Margu, the capital of which was Merv, in today's Turkmenistan.

The early Greek historian Ctesias, c. 400 BC (followed by Diodorus Siculus), alleged that the legendary Assyrian king Ninus had defeated a Bactrian king named Oxyartes in c. 2140 BC, or some 1000 years before the Trojan War. Since the decipherment of cuneiform script in the 19th century, however, which enabled actual Assyrian records to be read, historians have ascribed little value to the Greek account.

According to some writers,  Bactria was the homeland (Airyanem Vaejah) of Indo-Iranians who moved south-west into Iran and the north-west of the South Asian subcontinent around 2500–2000 BC. Later, it became the northern province of the Achaemenid Empire in Central Asia. It was in these regions, where the fertile soil of the mountainous country is surrounded by the Turan Depression, that the prophet Zoroaster was said to have been born and gained his first adherents. Avestan, the language of the oldest portions of the Zoroastrian Avesta, was one of the Old Iranian languages, and is the oldest attested member of the Eastern Iranian languages.

Achaemenid Empire 

Ernst Herzfeld suggested that Bactria belonged to the Medes before its annexation to the Achaemenid Empire by Cyrus the Great in sixth century BC, after which it and  Margiana formed the twelfth satrapy of Persia. After Darius III had been defeated by Alexander the Great, the satrap of Bactria, Bessus, attempted to organise a national resistance but was captured by other warlords and delivered to Alexander. He was then tortured and killed.

Under Persian rule, many Greeks were deported to Bactria, so that their communities and language became common in the area. During the reign of Darius I, the inhabitants of the Greek city of Barca, in Cyrenaica, were deported to Bactria for refusing to surrender assassins. In addition, Xerxes also settled the "Branchidae" in Bactria; they were the descendants of Greek priests who had once lived near Didyma (western Asia Minor) and betrayed the temple to him. Herodotus also records a Persian commander threatening to enslave daughters of the revolting Ionians and send them to Bactria. Persia subsequently conscripted Greek men from these settlements in Bactria into their military, as did Alexander later.

Alexander The Great 

Alexander conquered Sogdiana. In the south, beyond the Oxus, he met strong resistance, but ultimately conquered the region through both military force and diplomacy, marrying Roxana, daughter of the defeated Satrap of Bactria, Oxyartes. He founded two Greek cities in Bactria, including his easternmost, Alexandria Eschate (Alexandria the Furthest).

After Alexander's death, Diodorus Siculus tells us that Philip received dominion over Bactria, but Justin names Amyntas to that role. At the Treaty of Triparadisus, both Diodorus Siculus and Arrian agree that the satrap Stasanor gained control over Bactria. Eventually, Alexander's empire was divided up among the generals in Alexander's army. Bactria became a part of the Seleucid Empire, named after its founder, Seleucus I.

Seleucid Empire 
The Macedonians, especially Seleucus I and his son Antiochus I, established the Seleucid Empire and founded a number of Greek towns. The Greek language became dominant for some time there.

The paradox that Greek presence was more prominent in Bactria than in areas far closer to Greece can possibly be explained by past deportations of Greeks to Bactria. When Alexanders troops entered Bacrtia they discovered communities of Greeks who appeared to have been deported to the region by the Persians in previous centuries.

Greco-Bactrian Kingdom 

Considerable difficulties faced by the Seleucid kings and the attacks of Pharaoh Ptolemy II Philadelphus gave the satrap of Bactria, Diodotus I, the opportunity to declare independence about 245 BC and conquer Sogdia. He was the founder of the Greco-Bactrian Kingdom. Diodotus and his successors were able to maintain themselves against the attacks of the Seleucids—particularly from Antiochus III the Great, who was ultimately defeated by the Romans (190 BC).

The Greco-Bactrians were so powerful that they were able to expand their territory as far as South Asia:

The Greco-Bactrians used the Greek language for administrative purposes, and the local Bactrian language was also Hellenized, as suggested by its adoption of the Greek alphabet and Greek loanwords. In turn, some of these words were also borrowed by modern Pashto.

Indo-Greek Kingdom 

The Bactrian king Euthydemus I and his son Demetrius I crossed the Hindu Kush mountains and began the conquest of the Indus valley. For a short time, they wielded great power: a great Greek empire seemed to have arisen far in the East. But this empire was torn by internal dissension and continual usurpations. When Demetrius advanced far east of the Indus River, one of his generals, Eucratides, made himself king of Bactria, and soon in every province there arose new usurpers, who proclaimed themselves kings and fought against each other.

Most of them we know only by their coins, a great many of which are found in Afghanistan. By these wars, the dominant position of the Greeks was undermined even more quickly than would otherwise have been the case. After Demetrius and Eucratides, the kings abandoned the Attic standard of coinage and introduced a native standard, no doubt to gain support from outside the Greek minority.

In the Indus valley, this went even further. The Indo-Greek king Menander I (known as Milinda in South Asia), recognized as a great conqueror, converted to Buddhism. His successors managed to cling to power until the last known Indo-Greek ruler, a king named Strato II, who ruled in the Punjab region until around 55 BC. Other sources, however, place the end of Strato II's reign as late as 10 AD.

Daxia, Tukhara and Tokharistan
Daxia, Ta-Hsia, or Ta-Hia was the name given in antiquity by the Han Chinese to Tukhara or Tokhara: the central part of Bactria. The name "Daxia" appears in Chinese from the 3rd century BC to designate a little-known kingdom located somewhere west of China. This was possibly a consequence of the first contacts between China and the Greco-Bactrian Kingdom.

During the 2nd century BC, the Greco-Bactrians were conquered by nomadic Indo-European tribes from the north, beginning with the Sakas (160 BC). The Sakas were overthrown in turn by the Da Yuezhi ("Greater Yuezhi") during subsequent decades. The Yuezhi had conquered Bactria by the time of the visit of the Chinese envoy Zhang Qian (circa 127 BC), who had been sent by the Han emperor to investigate lands to the west of China. The first mention of these events in European literature appeared in the 1st century BC, when Strabo described how "the Asii, Pasiani, Tokhari, and Sakarauli" had taken part in the "destruction of the Greco-Bactrian kingdom". Ptolemy subsequently mentioned the central role of the Tokhari among other tribes in Bactria. As Tukhara or Tokhara it included areas that were later part of Surxondaryo Region in Uzbekistan, southern Tajikistan and northern Afghanistan. The Tokhari spoke a language known later as Bactrian – an Iranian language. (The Tokhari and their language should not be confused with the Tocharian people who lived in the Tarim Basin between the 3rd and 9th centuries AD, or the Tocharian languages that form another branch of Indo-European languages.)

The name Daxia was used in the Shiji ("Records of the Grand Historian") by Sima Qian. Based on the reports of Zhang Qian, the Shiji describe Daxia as an important urban civilization of about one million people, living in walled cities under small city kings or magistrates. Daxia was an affluent country with rich markets, trading in an incredible variety of objects, coming from as far as Southern China. By the time Zhang Qian visited, there was no longer a major king, and the Bactrians were under the suzerainty of the Yuezhi. Zhang Qian depicted a rather sophisticated but demoralised people who were afraid of war. Following these reports, the Chinese emperor Wu Di was informed of the level of sophistication of the urban civilizations of Ferghana, Bactria and Parthia, and became interested in developing commercial relationship with them:  These contacts immediately led to the dispatch of multiple embassies from the Chinese, which helped to develop trade along the Silk Roads.

Kujula Kadphises, the xihou (prince) of the Yuezhi, united the region in the early 1st century and laid the foundations for the powerful, but short-lived, Kushan Empire. In the 3rd century AD, Tukhara was under the rule of the Kushanshas (Indo-Sasanians).

Tokharistan

The form Tokharistan – the suffix -stan means "place of" in Persian – appeared for the first time in the 4th century, in Buddhist texts, such as the Vibhasa-sastra. Tokhara was known in Chinese sources as Tuhuluo (吐呼羅)  which is first mentioned during the Northern Wei era. In the Tang dynasty, the name is transcribed as Tuhuoluo (土豁羅). Other Chinese names are Doushaluo 兜沙羅, Douquluo 兜佉羅 or Duhuoluo 覩貨羅. During the 5th century AD, Bactria was controlled by the Xionites and the Hephthalites, but was subsequently reconquered by the Sassanid Empire.

Introduction of Islam 

By the mid-7th century AD, Islam under the Rashidun Caliphate had come to rule much of the Middle East and western areas of Central Asia.

In 663 AD, the Umayyad Caliphate attacked the Buddhist Shahi dynasty ruling in Tokharistan. The Umayyad forces captured the area around Balkh, including the Buddhist monastery at Nava Vihara, causing the Shahis to retreat to the Kabul Valley.

In the 8th century AD, a Persian from Balkh known as Saman Khuda left Zoroastrianism for Islam while living under the Umayyads. His children founded the Samanid Empire (875–999 AD). Persian became the official language and had a higher status than Bactrian, because it was the language of Muslim rulers. It eventually replaced the latter as the common language due to the preferential treatment as well as colonization.

Bactrian people 

Several important trade routes from India and China (including the Silk Road) passed through Bactria and, as early as the Bronze Age, this had allowed the accumulation of vast amounts of wealth by the mostly nomadic population. The first proto-urban civilization in the area arose during the 2nd millennium BC.

Control of these lucrative trade routes, however, attracted foreign interest, and in the 6th century BC the Bactrians were conquered by the Persians, and in the 4th century BC by Alexander the Great. These conquests marked the end of Bactrian independence. From around 304 BC the area formed part of the Seleucid Empire, and from around 250 BC it was the centre of a Greco-Bactrian kingdom, ruled by the descendants of Greeks who had settled there following the conquest of Alexander the Great.

The Greco-Bactrians, also known in Sanskrit as Yavanas, worked in cooperation with the native Bactrian aristocracy. By the early 2nd century BC the Greco-Bactrians had created an impressive empire that stretched southwards to include north-west India. By about 135 BC, however, this kingdom had been overrun by invading Yuezhi tribes, an invasion that later brought about the rise of the powerful Kushan Empire.

Bactrians were recorded in Strabo's Geography:
"Now in early times the Sogdians and Bactrians did not differ much from the nomads in their modes of life and customs, although the Bactrians were a little more civilised; however, of these, as of the others, Onesicritus does not report their best traits, saying, for instance, that those who have become helpless because of old age or sickness are thrown out alive as prey to dogs kept expressly for this purpose, which in their native tongue are called "undertakers," and that while the land outside the walls of the metropolis of the Bactrians looks clean, yet most of the land inside the walls is full of human bones; but that Alexander broke up the custom."

The Bactrians spoke Bactrian, a north-eastern Iranian language. Bactrian became extinct, replaced by north-eastern Iranian languages such as Pashto, Yidgha, Munji, and Ishkashmi. The Encyclopaedia Iranica states: The principal religions of the area before the Islamic invasion were Zoroastrianism and Buddhism. Contemporary Tajiks are the descendants of ancient Eastern Iranian inhabitants of Central Asia, in particular, the Sogdians and the Bactrians, and possibly other groups, with an admixture of Western Iranian Persians and non-Iranian peoples. The Encyclopædia Britannica states:

In popular culture 
 The six-part documentary Alexander's Lost World explores the possible sites of  Bactrian cities that historians believe were founded by Alexander the Great, including Alexandria on the Oxus. The series also explores the pre-existing Oxus civilization.
 The site was portrayed in the 2004 film Alexander where Darius III was found dying.
 Bactria, or The Bactrian Kingdom, is a playable nation in the game Imperator: Rome, being a satrapy of the Seleukid Empire.

See also 
 History of Afghanistan
 History of Uzbekistan
 Bactria–Margiana Archaeological Complex
 Tillya Tepe
 Bactrian camel
 Bahlikas
 Greater Khorasan
 Dalverzin Tepe
 Balkh

Notes

Sources 

 Bernard, Paul (1994). "The Greek Kingdoms of Central Asia." In: History of civilizations of Central Asia, Volume II. The development of sedentary and nomadic civilizations: 700 B.C. to A.D. 250, pp. 99–129. Harmatta, János, ed., 1994. Paris: UNESCO Publishing.
 Beal, Samuel (trans.). Si-Yu-Ki: Buddhist Records of the Western World, by Hiuen Tsiang. Two volumes. London. 1884. Reprint: Delhi: Oriental Books Reprint Corporation, 1969.
 Beal, Samuel (trans.). The Life of Hiuen-Tsiang by the Shaman Hwui Li, with an Introduction containing an account of the Works of I-Tsing. London, 1911. Reprint: New Delhi: Munshiram Manoharlal, 1973.
 Cotterell, Arthur. From Aristotle to Zoroaster, 1998; pages 57–59. .
 Hill, John E. 2003. "Annotated Translation of the Chapter on the Western Regions according to the Hou Hanshu." Second Draft Edition.
 Hill, John E. 2004. The Peoples of the West from the Weilüe 魏略 by Yu Huan 魚豢: A Third Century Chinese Account Composed between 239 and 265 AD. Draft annotated English translation.
 Holt, Frank Lee. (1999). Thundering Zeus: The Making of Hellenistic Bactria. Berkeley: University of California Press.(hardcover).
 Holt, Frank Lee. (2005). Into the Land of Bones: Alexander the Great in Afghanistan. University of California Press. .
Waghmar, Burzine. (2020). "Between Hind and Hellas: the Bactrian Bridgehead (with an appendix on Indo-Hellenic interactions)". In: Indo-Hellenic Cultural Transactions. (2020). Edited by Radhika Seshan. Mumbai: K. R. Cama Oriental Institute, 2020 [2021], pp. 187–228. ISBN 978-938-132418-9, (paperback). 
 Tremblay, Xavier (2007) "The Spread of Buddhism in Serindia ― Buddhism among Iranians, Tocharians and Turks before the 13th century." Xavier Tremblay. In: The Spread of Buddhism. (2007). Edited by Ann Heirman and Stephan Peter Bumbacher. Handbook of Oriental Studies. Section Eight, Central Asia. Edited by Denis Sinor and Nicola Di Cosmo. Brill, Lieden; Boston. pp. 75–129.
 Watson, Burton (trans.). "Chapter 123: The Account of Dayuan." Translated from the Shiji by Sima Qian. Records of the Grand Historian of China II (Revised Edition). Columbia University Press, 1993, pages 231–252.  (hardback),  (paperback).
 Watters, Thomas. On Yuan Chwang's Travels in India (A.D. 629–645). Reprint: New Delhi: Mushiram Manoharlal Publishers, 1973.
 
 Walbank, F.W. (1981). "The Hellenistic World". Fontana Press. .

External links 

 Bactrian Coins
 Bactrian Gold
 Livius.org: Bactria
 Batriane du nord—about the Termez region, an archeological site
 Art of the Bronze Age: Southeastern Iran, Western Central Asia, and the Indus Valley, an exhibition catalog from The Metropolitan Museum of Art (fully available online as PDF), which contains material on Bactria

 
States and territories established in the 3rd millennium BC
States and territories disestablished in the 10th century
Buddhism in Afghanistan
Buddhism in Iran
Historical regions
Historical regions of Afghanistan
Historical regions of Iran
History of Central Asia
History of South Asia